Mchenga eucinostomus is a species of fish in the family Cichlidae. It is found in Malawi, Mozambique, and Tanzania. Its natural habitat is freshwater lakes.

Mchenga eucinostomus is a Lekking fish, the males build sand castles. The lek member with the tallest mound of sand – almost a meter wide at the base – wins the females. These sandcastles take this ten centimeter (four inch) long animal two weeks to build.

References

eucinostomus
Fish described in 1922
Taxonomy articles created by Polbot